Johan Fredrik Heyerdahl (21 October 1937 – 21 April 2021) was a Norwegian publisher. He was chief editor of the Den Norske Bokklubben from 1965 to 1983, and secretary general of Norse Federation (Nordmannsforbundet) from 1983 to 2000.

Career
Born in 1937 in Oslo, Heyerdahl was a son of Thomas Mørch Heyerdahl and Sol Maurer, and married Else Adele Christensen in 1962. He was then appointed chief editor of Den Norske Bokklubben from 1965 to 1983. From 1983 to 2000 he was secretary general of the Norse Federation (Nordmannsforbundet), and also edited the federation's periodical The Norseman. He was a literary critic for the newspaper Aftenposten from 1983 to 1990, and edited Norwegian Literature from 1990.

Heyerdahl died on 21 April 2021, 83 years old.

References

1937 births
2021 deaths
Businesspeople from Oslo
Journalists from Oslo
Norwegian publishers (people)